John C. Harmon (June 16, 1845January 22, 1921) was an American lumberman and pioneer of Wisconsin and Washington.  He was a member of the Wisconsin State Assembly, representing Chippewa County during the 1893 sessions.

Biography
John C. Harmon was born in June 1845 in Wooster, Ohio.  As a child, he came with his parents to the Wisconsin Territory, settling in Beaver Dam in 1847.  He was educated there and went to work in Chippewa County, Wisconsin, in the lumber business.  He was justice of the peace and county supervisor in Chippewa County, and was elected town treasurer of the town of Big Bend in 1881 and 1882.

He then moved into the city of Chippewa Falls, Wisconsin, where he was again elected county supervisor and member of the city council.  He was elected to the Wisconsin State Assembly in 1892, running on the Democratic Party ticket.  He represented Chippewa County's first Assembly district, which then comprised the southwest corner of the county.  He was part of a brief Democratic majority in the Legislature. His most notable contribution was likely authoring the first law to make Labor Day a holiday in Wisconsin.  He was not a candidate for re-election in 1894.

He moved to Puyallup, Washington, about 1908 and resided there until his death in 1921.  His body was interred at Chippewa Falls' historic Forest Hill Cemetery.

Electoral history

Wisconsin Assembly (1892)

| colspan="6" style="text-align:center;background-color: #e9e9e9;"| General Election, November 8, 1892

References

External links
 

1845 births
1921 deaths
People from Wooster, Ohio
Politicians from Chippewa Falls, Wisconsin
People from Puyallup, Washington
County supervisors in Wisconsin
Democratic Party members of the Wisconsin State Assembly
19th-century American politicians